Amanah dalam Cinta (Amanah in Love) is an Indonesian TV serial that was aired on RCTI. It was produced video productions house public distributor company network by SinemArt directed by Indrayanto Kurniawan.

Cast
 Julie Estelle as Julie
 Christian Sugiono as Milo
 Ali Syakieb as Dhika
 Alice Norin as Alya
 Kevin Andrean as Wisnu
 Nessa Sadin as Diandra
 Rudy Salam as Prayogo
 Rowiena Sahertian as Diana
 Lily SP as Murni

Synopsis
Julie is a brave, cheerful girl with a very attractive personality. Although sometimes she can be a bit mischievous, she is so lovable. With her adorable personality she easily gets out of punishments when she does something wrong. Julie lives with her uncle, Ahmad, and aunt, Murni's family. Ahmad is a very possessive and controlling person who decides for Julie all the important decision in Julie's life, such as where she should go to school and to whom she should marry.

Julie decides to move to Jakarta after being persuaded by Radit. He tells her that Jakarta is the place to study and pursue her dream to become a famous chef. He steals Julie's money when they are on a bus on their way to Jakarta. She does not know what to do. While in deep sadness, the bus she rides gets into an accident. A married couple in the bus, Arvino and Meetha, ask for Julie's help to introduce Vino, their son, to their big family in Jakarta. Julie accepts their request. Julie and Vino are the only survivors of the bus accident.

External links
 Amanah dalam Cinta

Indonesian television series